Andrew Ronald MacKenzie "Nobbie" Ralph (26 April 1908 – 6 June 1992) was a South African cricketer who played first-class cricket from 1931 to 1946, mostly for Western Province.

Ralph was one of the leading batsmen in the Currie Cup in 1936–37, with 517 runs in six matches at an average of 86.16. His highest first-class score was 142 against Border in December 1934, when he opened the batting and made the only century in the match, which Western Province won by an innings. He captained Western Province several times, taking over in 1939-40 when Pieter van der Bijl went off to fight in World War II.

Ralph served as convenor of the national cricket selectors in the 1950s.

References

External links

1908 births
1992 deaths
Cricketers from Cape Town
South African cricketers
Western Province cricketers
Griqualand West cricketers